Mary Tombiri (born 23 July 1972) is a retired female track and field sprinter from Nigeria. At the 1994 Commonwealth Games she, together with Faith Idehen, Christy Opara-Thompson and Mary Onyali, won the gold medal in 4 x 100 metres relay.

Achievements

External links

1972 births
Living people
Nigerian female sprinters
Olympic bronze medalists for Nigeria
Athletes (track and field) at the 1994 Commonwealth Games
Athletes (track and field) at the 1996 Summer Olympics
Commonwealth Games gold medallists for Nigeria
Commonwealth Games medallists in athletics
African Games bronze medalists for Nigeria
African Games medalists in athletics (track and field)
Universiade medalists in athletics (track and field)
Athletes (track and field) at the 1995 All-Africa Games
Universiade silver medalists for Nigeria
Medalists at the 1993 Summer Universiade
Medalists at the 1995 Summer Universiade
20th-century Nigerian women
21st-century Nigerian women
Medallists at the 1994 Commonwealth Games